Winthrop Welles Ketcham (sometimes spelled Ketchum, June 29, 1820 – December 6, 1879) was a United States representative from Pennsylvania and a United States district judge of the United States District Court for the Western District of Pennsylvania.

Education and career

Born on June 29, 1820, in Wilkes-Barre, Pennsylvania, Ketcham pursued classical studies. He was an instructor at Wyoming Seminary in Kingston, Pennsylvania from 1844 to 1847, and at Girard College in Philadelphia, Pennsylvania in 1848 and 1849. He read law in the offices of Lazarus Denison Shoemaker and Charles Denison and was admitted to the bar January 8, 1850. He entered private practice in Wilkes-Barre from 1850 to 1855. Ketcham became a Republican when that party was first organized in 1854, having been a Whig prior to that time. He was prothonotary for Luzerne County, Pennsylvania from 1855 to 1858. He was a member of the Pennsylvania House of Representatives in 1858. He was a member of the Pennsylvania State Senate for the 10th district from 1859 to 1861. He was a delegate to the 1860 and 1864 Republican National Conventions. He resumed private practice in Wilkes-Barre from 1861 to 1863. He was an unsuccessful candidate for election in 1864 to the 39th United States Congress. He was solicitor for the Court of Claims from 1864 to 1866. He again resumed private practice in Wilkes-Barre from 1867 to 1873. In 1868, he was a presidential elector from Pennsylvania, and cast his vote for Ulysses S. Grant. In 1866, 1869, and 1872, he received votes in the Republican state conventions for the office of Governor of Pennsylvania.

Congressional service

Ketcham was elected as a Republican from Pennsylvania's 12th congressional district to the United States House of Representatives of the 44th United States Congress and served from March 4, 1875, until July 19, 1876, when he resigned to accept a federal judicial appointment.

Federal judicial service

Ketcham was nominated by President Ulysses S. Grant on June 7, 1876, to a seat on the United States District Court for the Western District of Pennsylvania vacated by Judge Wilson McCandless. He was confirmed by the United States Senate on June 26, 1876, and received his commission the same day. His service terminated on December 6, 1879, due to his death in Pittsburgh, Pennsylvania. He was interred in Hollenback Cemetery in Wilkes-Barre.

Family

Ketcham's father, Lewis N. Ketcham, was a painter and cabinet-maker. At an early age Ketcham assisted his father in painting buildings in the city and lock-houses along the canal. In 1846, he married Sarah Urquhart, with whom he had a daughter, Ella, and a son, J. Marshall.

References

Sources
 
 
 

1820 births
1879 deaths
19th-century American judges
19th-century American politicians
Burials in Pennsylvania
Judges of the United States District Court for the Western District of Pennsylvania
Republican Party members of the Pennsylvania House of Representatives
Pennsylvania lawyers
Pennsylvania prothonotaries
Republican Party Pennsylvania state senators
Politicians from Wilkes-Barre, Pennsylvania
Republican Party members of the United States House of Representatives from Pennsylvania
United States federal judges admitted to the practice of law by reading law
United States federal judges appointed by Ulysses S. Grant